James Piot (born October 14, 1998) is an American professional golfer from Canton, Michigan. In 2021, he won the U.S. Amateur.

Amateur career
Piot was born in Farmington Hills, Michigan. In high school, he led Detroit Catholic Central to three consecutive state championships and won the Michigan junior amateur championship in 2015.

Piot enrolled at Michigan State in 2017, majoring in finance. He earned Big Ten Freshman of the Year honors in 2018. As a fifth-year senior in 2021, he was named an All-Big Ten First Team selection, an All-American Honorable Mention, and set a school record for lowest scoring average.

At the 2020 U.S. Amateur, Piot was the No. 2 seed in stroke-play before losing in the second round. He advanced to the final in 2021 at Oakmont Country Club, winning four consecutive holes on the back-nine to defeat Austin Greaser of North Carolina, 2 and 1. Piot became the first U.S. Amateur champion from Michigan.

Professional career
Piot turned professional in May 2022.

In May 2022, Piot was announced as one of the participants for the inaugural LIV Golf event to be played June 9-11 at Centurion Club in London, England.

Amateur wins
2019 Island Resort Intercollegiate, Inverness Intercollegiate
2021 Hoosier Collegiate Invite, Golf Association of Michigan Championship, U.S. Amateur, Island Resort Intercollegiate
2022 Georgia Cup

Source:

Results in major championships

CUT = missed the half-way cut

U.S. national team appearances
Spirit International Amateur: 2021 (winners)

References

External links
Michigan State profile

American male golfers
LIV Golf players
Michigan State Spartans men's golfers
Golfers from Michigan
Detroit Catholic Central High School alumni
1998 births
Living people